Hoplolathys is a monotypic genus of East African cribellate araneomorph spiders in the family Dictynidae containing the single species, Hoplolathys aethiopica. It was first described by Lodovico di Caporiacco in 1947, and has only been found in Ethiopia.

References

Endemic fauna of Ethiopia
Dictynidae
Monotypic Araneomorphae genera
Spiders of Africa